Nicholas Alexander Veliotes (born October 28, 1928) is a former United States Foreign Service Officer and diplomat.  He served as United States Ambassador to Jordan (1978–81) and Egypt (1984–86). He is a member of  the American Academy of Diplomacy and Council on Foreign Relations.

Early life
Veliotes was born in Oakland, California, on October 28, 1928 to Greek immigrants. He had an older brother, the Rock and Roll Hall of Famer Johnny Otis. He served in the U.S. Army from 1946 to 1948 and then went on to graduate from the University of California, Berkeley (B.A., 1952; M.A., 1954) where he played football and rugby.

Diplomatic career
Veliotes joined the U.S. Foreign Service in 1955.  He served as consular officer in Naples in 1955-57 and economic officer in Rome in 1957-60 before returning to the U.S. to work in the Secretariat and then in the Bureau of Cultural and Educational Affairs from 1962 to 1964.  He then served as political officer New Delhi (1964–66) and Vientiane (1966–69) before being selected as a Woodrow Wilson Fellow at Princeton University in 1969. 

Veliotes was Special Assistant to the Deputy Secretary of State (1970–73), then served as Deputy Chief of Mission in Tel Aviv, returning to the Department of State as Deputy Director of the Policy Planning Staff (1976–77) and then Deputy Assistant Secretary of State for Near Eastern and South Asian Affairs (1977–78). He was Ambassador to Jordan (1978–81) and Assistant Secretary of State for Near Eastern and South Asian Affairs (1981–84). He then served as Ambassador to Egypt until his retirement from the Foreign Service in April, 1986.

Post-Foreign Service career
In May 1986, Veliotes became President of the Association of American Publishers and retired as President Emeritus in June 1997. He is also a member of the Middle East Institute, Foundation for Middle East Peace, and the Veterans of Foreign Wars. Veliotes has received the Glen T. Seaborg Award (the equivalent of a lifetime achievement award for former Cal football alumni), the B'nai Brith "Faith of Our Fathers" Award for contributions to peace in the Middle East, a number of Presidential and Departmental Honor Awards, and also the "Chevalier del Ordre des Arts et des Lettres" Award from the French Government for outstanding services to international publishers. He currently serves on the boards of Amideast and the American Academy of Diplomacy, as well as Chairman for the Hollings Center for International Dialogue.

Service chronology

References

External links

1928 births
Living people
People from Oakland, California
American people of Greek descent
Ambassadors of the United States to Jordan
Ambassadors of the United States to Egypt
United States Foreign Service personnel
University of California, Berkeley alumni
American expatriates in Italy
American expatriates in India
American expatriates in Laos
American expatriates in Israel